Ezequiel Lezcano (born 15 April 1982 in Esperanza (Santa Fe), Argentina) is an Argentine footballer currently playing for 9 de Julio de Morteros of the Torneo Argentino B in Argentina.

Teams
  Unión de Santa Fe 2001-2002
  Tacuary 2003
  La Perla del Oeste 2004
  Patronato de Paraná 2004-2005
  Libertad de Sunchales 2005-2006
  Unión de Sunchales 2006-2008
  Libertad de Sunchales 2008–2013
  9 de Julio de Morteros 2013-

References
 
 

1981 births
Living people
Argentine footballers
Argentine expatriate footballers
Club Atlético Patronato footballers
Unión de Santa Fe footballers
Unión de Sunchales footballers
Libertad de Sunchales footballers
Club Tacuary footballers
Expatriate footballers in Paraguay
Association football midfielders
People from Esperanza, Santa Fe
Sportspeople from Santa Fe Province